Jussy station (French: Gare de Jussy) is a former railway station located in the commune of Jussy in the Aisne department, France. The station is located on the line from Amiens to Reims, between the stations of Flavy-le-Martel and Mennessis. The station was closed in December 2007, and replaced by a taxi service to Flavy-le-Martel station.

See also
List of SNCF stations in Hauts-de-France

References

Defunct railway stations in Aisne
Railway stations closed in 2007